Pterophorus lacteipennis is a moth of the family Pterophoridae described by Francis Walker in 1864. It is found in south and southeast Asia, including Taiwan, Burma, Borneo, the Solomon Islands, Australia and New Guinea.

External links
Australian Faunal Directory
Image

Moths of Australia
lacteipennis
Moths of Asia
Moths described in 1864